Port Djema is a 1997 French drama film directed by Eric Heumann. It was entered into the 47th Berlin International Film Festival where Heumann won the Silver Bear for Best Director. The music for the film was written by Sanjay Mishra and released as a soundtrack album called Port Djema.

Cast
 Jean-Yves Dubois as Pierre Feldman
 Nathalie Boutefeu as Alice
 Christophe Odent as Jérôme Delbos
 Edouard Montoute as Ousman
 Frédéric Pierrot as Antoine Barasse
 Claire Wauthion as Sister Marie-Françoise
 Frédéric Andréi

Soundtrack

Guitarist Sanjay Mishra contributed the music for the soundtrack, released in 1997.

Track listing
All music composed and arranged by Sanjay Mishra, except for "Amaldu" by Abeba Haile.
For Julia
Lullaby
Amaldu
Mirage
Ambient sounds
Incidental music 1
Ambient sounds
Incidental Music 2
Passage into dawn
Ambient sounds
Incidental music 3
Ambient percussion / Amaldu
Incidental music 4
Manali
For Julia (reprise)

References

External links

1997 films
1997 drama films
French drama films
1990s French-language films
Greek drama films
Italian drama films
Films shot in Eritrea
1990s French films